Nortonburg is an unincorporated community in Flat Rock Township, Bartholomew County, in the U.S. state of Indiana.

History
A post office was established at Nortonburg (but spelled Nortonburgh) in 1886, and remained in operation until it was discontinued in 1912. It was named in honor of the Norton family of settlers.

Geography

References

Unincorporated communities in Bartholomew County, Indiana
Unincorporated communities in Indiana